The Anson County Regiment was authorized on September 9, 1775 by the Third North Carolina Provincial Congress.  The regiment was engaged in battles and skirmishes against the British and Cherokee during the American Revolution in North Carolina, South Carolina and Georgia between 1776 and 1781.  It was active until the end of the war.

Known officers
The commanders/Colonels were:
 Colonel Samuel Spencer (September 9, 1775 to February 1776)
 Colonel Unknown Hicks
 Colonel Charles Medlocke (1776 to 1779, 2nd Colonel), (1775 to 1776, Lieutenant Colonel)
 Colonel Thomas Wade (March 2, 1776 to 1783)
When the British invaded North Carolina in September 1780 and February 1781, Colonel Thomas Wade went to Virginia to avoid capture.  After Lord Cornwallis left North Carolina in May 1781, he returned to Anson County. There was a constant threat from Loyalist Colonel David Fanning in the county and very active until 1782.

Known engagements
Known engagements of the Anson County Regiment include:
 February 27, 1776, Battle of Moore's Creek Bridge
 August 1 to November 1, 1776, Cherokee Expedition 1776
 March 3, 1779, Briar Creek, Georgia
 April 14, 1780, Battle of Monck's Corner #1, South Carolina
 March 28 to May 12, 1780, Siege of Charleston 1780. South Carolina
 July 21, 1780, Battle of Colson's Mill
 August 16, 1780, Battle of Camden, South Carolina
 September 9, 1780, Anson County
 September 26, 1780, Battle of Charlotte
 March 15, 1780, Battle of Guilford Court House
 March 31, 1781, Cole's Bridge #2
 August 3, 1781, Piney Bottom Creek
 August 4, 1781, Beatti's Bridge
 August 9, 1781, Richmond & Cumberland Counties
 August 28, 1781, Fanning's Mill
 September 1, 1781, Little Raft Swamp
 September 8, 1781, Battle of Eutaw Springs, South Carolina
 September 13, 1781, Battle of Lindley's Mill
 October 15, 1781, Raft Swamp
 November 15, 1781, Brick House

See also
 List of American Revolutionary War battles
 Salisbury District Brigade
 Southern Campaigns: Pension Transactions for a description of the transcription effort by Will Graves
 Southern theater of the American Revolutionary War

References

Bibliography
  
 Arthur, John Preston, Western North Carolina; a history (1730-1913), National Society Daughters of the American Revolution of North Carolina. Edward Buncombe Chapter, Asheville, North Carolina,  Publication date 1914, Link, accessed Jan 29, 2019
 Hunter, C.L.; Sketches of western North Carolina, historical and biographical : illustrating principally the Revolutionary period of Mecklenburg, Rowan, Lincoln, and adjoining counties, accompanied with miscellaneous information, much of it never before published, Raleigh : Raleigh News Steam Job Print, 1877; pages 166-183
 

North Carolina militia
Anson County, North Carolina
1775 establishments in North Carolina
1775 in North Carolina